Geoff Ralston is the former President of Y Combinator. He was the CEO of La La Media, Inc., developer of Lala, a web browser-based music distribution site. Prior to Lala, Ralston worked for Yahoo!, where he was Vice President of Engineering and Chief Product Officer. In 1997, Ralston created Yahoo! Mail. In 2011 he co-founded Imagine K12, an education technology incubator with Alan Louie and Tim Brady. He joined Y Combinator in January 2012 and left at the end of 2022.

References

American technology chief executives
Living people
Dartmouth College alumni
Stanford University alumni
Y Combinator people
Year of birth missing (living people)